Metachanda holombra is a moth species in the oecophorine tribe Metachandini. It was described by Edward Meyrick in 1930.

References

Oecophorinae
Moths described in 1930
Taxa named by Edward Meyrick